Timothy Farmer (born March 18, 1964) is an American outdoorsman, musician, and television presenter.  He is known as the host and executive producer of the television shows Kentucky Afield, Tim Farmer's Country Kitchen, and Tim Farmer's Homemade Jam., for which he has won a total of five regional Emmy awards.  A motorcycle accident in 1984 left Farmer without the use of his right arm, and he has since worked with other Kentuckians to cope with and overcome similar physical disabilities

Early life
Farmer grew up in Mason County and Carter County, Kentucky.  He is the son of Jerry and Sherry Farmer, and has one older sister, Deborah, and one younger brother, Jonathon.  After graduating high school, Tim enlisted in the United States Marine Corps. After completing basic training in Parris Island South Carolina, Tim was stationed at Millington Naval Air Base, near Memphis, TN. He was honorably discharged following a 1984 motorcycle accident that left him unable to use his right arm.

Television career

Kentucky Afield

Farmer is the former host and executive producer of Kentucky Afield, produced by the Kentucky Department of Fish & Wildlife Resources.  Farmer hosted Kentucky Afield from 1995 until 2016, following previous host Dave Shuffett.  Kentucky Afield is the longest continuously-running outdoor TV show in the United States, beginning broadcasts in 1953.  On the show, Farmer has overcome the physical limitations caused by his right arm's paralysis.  Most notably, he has learned to shoot a bow and arrow by drawing the bow with his teeth. Farmer is also known for his sign-off, saying "I hope to see you in the woods or on the water." Tim has won 5 Emmys.

Awards
 1996 KAGC Communicator of the Year
 2005 Ohio Valley Regional Emmy Award Recipient for Human Interest
 2008 Ohio Valley Regional Emmy Award Recipient for best program host/moderator/narrator
 2013 Ohio Valley Regional Emmy Award Recipient for best program host/moderator/narrator
 2013 Ohio Valley Regional Emmy Award Recipient for Health Science and Environment
 2014 Ohio Valley Regional Emmy Award Recipient for best program host/moderator/narrator

Tim Farmer's Country Kitchen

Beginning production in 2012, Tim Farmer's Country Kitchen highlights country recipes and Kentucky restaurants and food producers. The show is hosted by Farmer and his wife Nikki and often features friends and other members of their family. It airs on Kentucky Educational Television stations KET, KET2 and KETKY in Kentucky, is distributed through the National Educational Telecommunications Association to Public Broadcasting System stations nationwide and online at YouTube and CarbonTV.

Tim Farmer's Homemade Jam

Produced since 2013 and airing on KET, KET2 and KETKY, Tim Farmer's Homemade Jam showcases Kentucky musicians.  Guests of the show have included J. D. Crowe and Carl Hurley.

References

External links
 Tim Farmer's Country Kitchen Website
 YouTube Channel
 Official CarbonTV Channel

1964 births
Living people
Television personalities from Louisville, Kentucky
People from Frankfort, Kentucky
People from Carter County, Kentucky
 United States Marines